The Manila Peninsula siege occurred on November 29, 2007, at The Peninsula Manila hotel in Makati, Philippines. Senator Antonio Trillanes IV, Brigadier General Danilo Lim, and 25 other Magdalo Group officers walked out of their trial for the 2003 Oakwood mutiny coup attempt and marched through the streets of Makati. The mutineers called for the ousting of President Gloria Macapagal Arroyo, and seized the Rizal function room on the second floor of the Manila Peninsula Hotel along Ayala Avenue. Former Vice-President Teofisto Guingona, Jr. as well as some of the soldiers from the Armed Forces of the Philippines joined the march to the hotel.

After several hours, Trillanes and Lim surrendered to government forces after a military armored personnel carrier barged into the glass door of the hotel lobby and the hotel walls and windows sustained weapons damage.  Trillanes and the mutineers were arrested while several journalists covering the event were detained. The journalists were subsequently released.

Occupation

On November 29, 2007, led by Sen. Antonio Trillanes IV and Army Brig. Gen. Danilo Lim, thirty soldiers with armed guards, on trial for the 2003 Oakwood Mutiny, walked out of court and marched towards the luxury Peninsula Manila Hotel. They were joined by former vice-president Teofisto Guingona, Jr., who called the gathering "New EDSA". They were also joined by other military personnel and civilians carrying M-16 or M-14 rifles. The soldiers, some of whom were carrying and wearing Magdalo (mutineers) flags and pins, marched along Makati Avenue and occupied The Peninsula Manila Hotel's second floor. Sen. Trillanes and Brig. Gen. Lim stayed in the Rizal function room negotiating most of the time.

Arroyo called for an emergency Cabinet meeting as she took a helicopter back to the Malacañan Palace amid tight security. Novaliches Catholic Bishop Antonio Tobias, Infanta Bishop Emeritus Julio Labayen, Jimmy Regalario of the Kilusang makabansang Ekonomiya, Father Robert Reyes, former University of the Philippines president Francisco Nemenzo, Bishop Julius Labayen, Bishop Antonio Tobias, and Fr. Robert Reyes joined Trillanes's group, as Executive Secretary Eduardo Ermita and Presidential Spokesperson-Press Secretary Ignacio Bunye rushed back to Malacañang. The Presidential Security Group sealed off the Palace while troops secured the North and South Luzon Expressways. A website soon appeared, proclaiming Lim and Senator Antonio Trillanes IV as the leaders of the coup. The website entry read: 
"Senator Antonio Trillanes, Brig. Gen. Danilo Lim, Magdalo soldiers, their guards and the people have started marching towards Makati triangle. [...] We presently find in existence a dangerous concept where the armed forces now owe their primary allegiance and loyalty to those who temporarily exercise the authority of the executive branch of the government rather than to the country and the Constitution they have sworn to protect. That is a concept we defy and struggle to eradicate. If you believe you are a man of will and courage with unselfish motives and brave enough to fight against such tyranny, rise up and be counted!"

The Philippine National Police declared a red alert status in Metro Manila as a result of the incident.

At 2:46 pm PST, Police Director Geary Barias, chief of the National Capital Region Police Office, ordered everyone inside the Manila Peninsula to vacate, according to reports on radio and television.

"I am asking all guests of the hotel to leave so that we can do our jobs," Barias said in a live interview.

Siege and assault
The Philippine military rushed at least three battalions of infantry, consisting of roughly 1,500 troops, to Metro Manila's Makati business district to crush the mutiny. The Philippine Marines on Thursday said it would be loyal to the chain of command and would help crush the rebellion led by Sen. Antonio Trillanes IV and Brig. Gen. Danilo Lim. The Marines sent three armored personnel carriers and two trucks of troops to Makati to support government police and military units in the area.

Judge Oscar Pimentel, Makati Regional Trial Court, issued an arrest warrant and Director Geary Barias, National Capital Region Police Office director, stated "Arrests will be made at 3 p.m."
The Philippine National Police (PNP) gave Sen. Antonio Trillanes IV and Brig. Gen. Danilo Lim until this time to surrender, as it evacuated guests and personnel inside The Peninsula Manila Hotel. Lim stated: "We make this fateful step of removing Mrs. Macapagal Arroyo from the presidency and undertake the formation of a new government."

The planned assault was held off until 3:58 p.m.  At 3:58 p.m., 50 Special Action Force commandos lined up outside The Peninsula Manila Hotel to enforce the arrest of rebel soldiers. The commandos, who were carrying gas masks, went into formation after rebel soldiers refused to accept warrants for their arrest. There were indications that the armed rebel soldiers inside the hotel were ready for battle.

Armored personnel carriers and Armoured fighting vehicles (AFV) of the police and the military were also dispatched around the building. The movement intensified after 4 p.m., when policemen in full-battle gear fired warning shots as they prepared to storm the hotel.  Footage taken by ABS-CBN Sky Patrol showed Special Action Force commandos moving in battle formation towards the hotel.

Glass on the windows was broken to allow the dispersal of tear gas to those held up inside the hotel. Afterwards, an exchange of fire was heard between the military and the Magdalo Group. Firing stopped at 4:30 p.m. Bishop Julio Labayen appealed: "Please do not storm the place.. so nobody gets hurt." (4:37 p.m.) Various TV and radio crews, as well as other media personnel, were trapped in the hotel, while the Palace appealed to media and the public to stay away from Makati.

The AFV broke into hotel lobby at 5:10 p.m., with soldiers pouring into the hotel. Sen. Antonio Trillanes IV and Brig. Gen. Danilo Lim decided to surrender to the arresting authorities to avoid loss of lives as several journalists and other civilians were with them. Director Geary Barias declared that the standoff at the Manila Peninsula Hotel was over as the mutinous soldiers agreed to leave the hotel and surrender to Barias after the 6 hour siege (5:30 p.m.).

Arrests
Trillanes, Lim, and their cohorts, and Guingona were arrested by the Philippine National Police and were sent to National Capital Region Police Office headquarters in Camp Bagong Diwa, Taguig. ABS-CBN News and Current Affairs, Bloomberg News, NHK, DWIZ, Manila Bulletin and Malaya journalists who were covering the event were also arrested. All of them were asked to leave their belongings and to not bring anything with them. They were advised by a lawyer not to talk as what the police were doing was against the law and violated their rights. Roman Catholic priest Fr. Robert Reyes and Bishop Julio Labayen were also seen boarding the same bus where the arrested press correspondents were transported in. The Special Action Force was involved in arresting Brigadier General Danilo Lim.

Trillanes said he was ready to face whatever charges the government will give him.

In a TV interview with ABS-CBN, National Defense Secretary Gilberto Teodoro defended the arrests of media reporters as the arresting officers "didn't know the journalists and may have mistook them as renegade soldiers," although several of these journalists were hosting several prominent TV programs. Several journalists, mostly from TV and radio, were released at the NCRPO HQ.

It was announced that a curfew from midnight to 5 am would be implemented in the regions of Metro Manila, Central Luzon, and Calabarzon for the night of November 29–30.

Aftermath
The Philippine National Police ordered a manhunt for the soldiers who escaped from the hotel, including Marine Captain Nicanor Faeldon; meanwhile, several persons of interest were detained at Camp Bagong Diwa in Taguig. Several journalists were also "processed" at Camp Bagong Diwa and were subsequently released. On December 1, fifty individuals, including Trillanes, were charged of rebellion at inquest proceedings.

On December 3, the Peninsula Manila became fully operational with an estimated damage at US$1.2 million. The next day, Armed Forces chief-of-staff Hermogenes Esperon announced the arrest of Communist New People’s Army operative Myrna Hombrebueno in connection with the rebellion, proving the connection between the Communists and rebels. Had Trillanes succeeded, according to Esperon, a National Transition Council (NTC), allegedly would replace the Arroyo administration, and the Philippines put under a "lean and mean" military and police force (per 5-page document – "Proposed Program"). Razon himself revealed that a "female press reporter" provided Faeldon a fake press I.D. card that caused his escape and that he is still inside Metro Manila. Razon also sacked the Makati police chief for failure to prevent the walk-out.

The Makati Regional Trial Court (RTC), upon receiving the cases on December 6, dismissed the cases against Guingona, Reyes, and other civilians, on December 13.

Reactions

Domestic
Chief Justice Reynato Puno reiterated that he was not interested in a proposal to head a caretaker government if President Arroyo was removed from power.
Sen. Rodolfo Biazon, a former Armed Forces Chief of Staff, said he hopes that the situation will not end up in "soldiers killing each other. I hope no more officers and even enlisted men are going to be sacrificed because they were either influenced or they were ordered to do things. I hope the turn of events [is] not going to be rejected by our people,"
Sen. Gregorio Honasan, who was implicated in the Oakwood mutiny, called for calm and sobriety.
Sen. Juan Miguel Zubiri called on the government to begin the negotiation efforts. He suggested that Honasan is the "best person" to lead the negotiations.
Senate Minority Leader Aquilino Pimentel Jr., meanwhile, said he supports the calls for President Arroyo’s resignation but he said these should be done through peaceful means.
Sen. Benigno Aquino III said the move of Trillanes reflects the "utter frustrations" of many Filipinos.
Sen. Manuel Roxas II, however, said any call for reforms should be done through legitimate programs and not through force.
Justice Secretary Raul Gonzalez said that President Arroyo will not declare a state of emergency because of the mutiny.
Press Secretary Ignacio Bunye said law enforcers were given internal guidelines on how to handle Trillanes and his group.
Armed Forces of the Philippines Chief General Hermogenes Esperon meanwhile said that they will take full measures to prevent any trouble in the area.
CBCP president and Jaro Archbishop Angel Lagdameo stated that the standoff and curfew serve as preview to Martial Law: "Yesterday and last night, the people holed-in at Peninsula Manila had a foretaste of what Martial Law could be. God save us from the worse!"
The Foreign Correspondents Association of the Philippines (FOCAP) [Burd Wang, Manila Correspondent of Guangming Daily of China] stated in a letter to Ignacio Bunye that the journalists arrested were "treated arbitrarily by authorities; We hope, that through your office, there will be no repetition of this deplorable action." The National Union of Journalists of the Philippines (NUJP) said in a statement that the Philippine National Police (PNP) treated the journalists as "enemies of the state. We protest in strongest terms the PNPs move to forcibly bring some journalists to the National Capital Region Police Office in Bicutan and condemn the confiscation of video footage of the day-long stand-off at the Manila Peninsula Hotel." Accordingly, the PNP leadership apologized to media representatives and crew, but it refused to accept that their response was "overkill". 
Mariano Garchitorena, the Manila Peninsula hotel’s public manager, stated that: Trillanes and company were gentlemen "To be fair di naman sila nag-abuso ng hotel namin (To be fair, they did not abuse our hotel staff). They were very gentlemanly in their act. They did not bother our staff and they did not bother our guests; He (Trillanes) assured us that they meant no harm to civilian to guests and all our staff of course."
The Philippine Press Institute, in a statement, described the detention of mediamen as an “unprecedented assault on press freedom. Patently unconstitutional and carried out with such impunity that the innocent captives were treated like common criminals, cuffed, ordered to raise their hands in surrender, and bussed to the country's most notorious camp, Bagong Diwa, in Bicutan.”
Speaker Jose de Venecia, Jr. agreed with Trillanes that there should be "reforms at the top; the rule of law must prevail in our people’s collective cry for reforms; Without a doubt we need reforms at the top. That is the reason we launched the moral revolution so the nation can retake the moral high ground and decisively move from the continuing crisis in our midst to a renewal of our values."
Sen. Jamby Madrigal, who was the biggest campaign contributor of Trillanes when he ran for senator, did not visit Trillanes at Camp Crame detention center and parted ways: “Thank you, Sonny [Trillanes’s nickname]. But let us just part ways."

International community
 Australia: The Australian Embassy cautioned their citizens and said, "Australians are advised to avoid the immediate area. Further demonstrations could occur over the weekend (December 1–2, 2007)"
 Canada: Canada's Department of Foreign Affairs and International Trade has posted a warning on its website for Canadians living in the Philippines to be careful with the implementation of the curfew.
 Singapore: Singapore has advised any Singaporeans in Manila to monitor any changes regarding the mutiny and to check in with the Singaporean embassy.
 United Kingdom: The British Embassy advised its nationals to exercise caution and take sensible precautions, and avoid large crowds and gatherings. The statement said, "You should exercise caution and take sensible precautions for your personal safety and avoid any large crowds, political gatherings and demonstrations. You should also keep yourself informed of developments and follow the advice of local authorities"
 United States: "The United States and the Philippines are long-time democratic allies and the US Embassy wishes to take this opportunity to reiterate our government's support for the rule of law, constitutional order, and the government of the Philippines; a statement from the US Embassy in Manila said, U.S. Ambassador Kristie A. Kenney has spoken with officials at Malacañan Palace to reiterate our confidence that this incident is swiftly and peacefully resolved by the Philippine National Police, supported by the Armed Forces of the Philippines, in accordance with Philippine law." Kenney stated: "No, we do not support extra-constitutional means to change government, in the Philippines or anywhere else in the world, I think it's always disturbing when you see people behaving contrary to the rule of law and constitutional authority; Washington will continue to "remain a very, very strong ally" of Arroyo, who is President George W. Bush's key ally in the Southeast Asian theatre of the US-led "war on terror; "We want this country to move forward."

References

External links
 ABS-CBN News
Philippine Daily Inquirer
 Timeline, Oakwood Mutiny
 Oakwood Mutiny Backgrounder
 Destabilization efforts against the Arroyo administration
 Profile, Antonio Fuentes Trillanes IV
 Profile, Brigadier General Danilo Lim
Transcript: Statement of Brig. Gen. Danilo Lim, Magdalo soldier
Sundalo:Tagapagtanggol ng Pilipino (Soldiers: Protector of the People), a Website containing various statements by Trillanes, et al.
 Inquirer.net, Updated List of 50 Detainees as of 02:33am (Mla time) 12/01/2007
 Sun Star,  Manila Peninsula Siege TIMELINE
 ABS-CBN, Rebellion in Makati, PHOTOS|TIMELINE|QUOTES|CHRONOLOGY|PAHAYAG NG PANGULO

Rebellions in the Philippines
Conflicts in 2007
2007 in the Philippines
Mutinies
Presidency of Gloria Macapagal Arroyo
History of Metro Manila
November 2007 events in the Philippines
Attempted coups in the Philippines